Athletes from Trinidad and Tobago competed at the 1972 Summer Olympics in Munich, West Germany. Trinidad and Tobago was represented by nineteen athletes and nine officials, competing in athletics, cycling, sailing, and swimming.

Athletics

Men's 100 metres
 Ainsely Armstrong
 First Heat — 10.56s (→ did not advance)

 Rudolph Reid
 First Heat — 10.74s (→ did not advance)

Men's 800 metres
 Lennox Stewart
 Heat — 1:48.7 (→ did not advance)

Men's 4 × 100 m Relay
 Ainsely Armstrong, Rudolph Reid, Bertram Lovell, and Hasely Crawford 
 Heat — DNS (→ did not advance)

 Arthur Cooper
 Trevor James
 Charles Joseph
 Patrick Marshall
 Laura Pierre
 Edwin Roberts

Cycling

Six cyclists represented Trinidad and Tobago in 1972

Individual road race
 Patrick Gellineau — did not finish (→ no ranking)
 Clive Saney — did not finish (→ no ranking)
 Anthony Sellier — did not finish (→ no ranking)
 Vernon Stauble — did not finish (→ no ranking)

Team time trial
 Pat Gellineau
 Clive Saney
 Anthony Sellier
 Vernon Stauble

Sprint
 Leslie King
 Winston Attong

1000m time trial
 Leslie King
 Final — 1:09.96 (→ 19th place)

Individual pursuit
 Vernon Stauble

Team pursuit
 Pat Gellineau
 Clive Saney
 Anthony Sellier
 Vernon Stauble

Sailing

Men's Flying Dutchman
 Richard Bennett and David Farfan

Swimming

Men's 100m Freestyle
 Geoffrey Ferreira
 Heat — 56.27s (→  did not advance)

References

External links
 Official Olympic Reports

Nations at the 1972 Summer Olympics
1972 Summer Olympics
1972 in Trinidad and Tobago